Irving David Kaplan is an American radiation oncologist at Beth Israel Deaconess Medical Center in Boston Massachusetts and an Assistant Professor at Harvard Medical School. Kaplan attended Medical School at Stanford University School of Medicine in 1985, interned at Kaiser Foundation Hospital in Internal Medicine at Santa Barbara in 1986. He Completed his residency in Radiation Oncology at Standard in 1989.

References

External links
 

Living people
Year of birth missing (living people)
21st-century American physicians
21st-century American scientists
American oncologists
Harvard University faculty
Stanford University School of Medicine alumni
Physician-scientists